The Oxfordshire flag is the flag of the historic county of Oxfordshire in England. It was registered with the Flag Institute on 9 October 2017.



Design

The flag originates as the coat of arms of the former County Council of Oxfordshire and was created in 1949. Following reorganisation of local government in 1974, the arms ceased to be used by any organisation but the design was later adapted as a flag and widely used across the county. The basic field colour is the dark blue long associated with Oxford University; against this two broad, white, wavy stripes symbolise the River Thames, and against this sits a red ox head, the combination of which alludes to the origin of the county town of Oxford. At the lower left and upper right corners, a golden oak tree and wheatsheaf or garb represent the county's woodland and agriculture.

Previous proposals

St Frideswide Cross
A previous proposal for county flag was called the St Frideswide Cross, honouring a local saint. The green background represents the fields and woodlands of the county; the blue symbolises the River Thames. It was designed by Edward Keene and Michael Garber of the Oxfordshire Association, in conjunction with the Flag Institute's Graham Bartram. In March 2011, the standard was flown for a week alongside the Union Flag outside the Eland House headquarters in Victoria of the Department for Communities and Local Government.

Armorial banner
An alternative commercially available flag exists, based on a banner of the coat of arms of the Oxfordshire County Council.

Gallery

References

External links
[ Flag Institute]
British County Flags – Oxfordshire Flag
The Oxfordshire Association – The County Flag Promotion

Culture in Oxfordshire
Oxfordshire
Oxfordshire
Oxfordshire